Hnaberd is a village in the Tsaghkahovit Municipality of the Aragatsotn Province of Armenia. The town has a 5th-century church. There is a large Urartian fortress nearby.

References 

World Gazetteer: Armenia – World-Gazetteer.com

Populated places in Aragatsotn Province